Match Point is a 2005 psychological thriller film written and directed by Woody Allen and starring Jonathan Rhys Meyers, Scarlett Johansson, Emily Mortimer, Matthew Goode, Brian Cox, and Penelope Wilton. In the film, Rhys Meyers' character marries into a wealthy family, but his social position is threatened by his affair with his brother-in-law's girlfriend, played by Scarlett Johansson. The film deals with themes of morality and greed, and explores the roles of lust, money, and luck in life, leading many to compare it to Allen's earlier film Crimes and Misdemeanors (1989). It was produced and filmed in London after Allen had difficulty finding financial support for the film in New York. The agreement obliged him to make it there using a cast and crew mostly from the United Kingdom. Allen quickly re-wrote the script, which was originally set in New York, for a British setting.

Critics in the United States praised the film and its British setting, and welcomed it as a return to form for Allen. In contrast, reviewers from the United Kingdom treated Match Point less favorably, finding fault with the locations and especially the British idiom in the dialogues. Allen was nominated for an Academy Award for Best Original Screenplay.

Plot
Chris Wilton, a recently retired tennis professional from Ireland, is taken on as an instructor at an upmarket club in London. He strikes up a friendship with a wealthy pupil, Tom Hewett, after discovering their common affinity for opera. Tom's older sister, Chloe, is smitten with Chris, and the two begin dating. During a family gathering, Chris meets Tom's American fiancée, Nola Rice, and they are instantly attracted to each other. Tom's mother, Eleanor, does not approve of her son's relationship with Nola, a struggling actress. This is a source of tension in the family. Chloe persuades her father, Alec, to give Chris a job as an executive in one of his companies.  Alec does so, and Chris begins to be accepted into the family, and marriage is discussed.

One afternoon, Nola's choice of profession is questioned by Eleanor, and Nola leaves the house in anger during a rainstorm. Chris follows Nola outside and confesses his feelings for her, and they passionately have sex in a wheat field. Feeling guilty, Nola treats this as an accident. Chris, however, wants an ongoing clandestine relationship. Chris and Chloe marry, while Tom ends his relationship with Nola.

Chloe, to her distress, does not become pregnant immediately. Chris vainly tries to track down Nola, but meets her by chance sometime later at Tate Modern. He discreetly asks for her number, and they begin an affair. While Chris is spending time with his wife's family, Nola calls to inform him that she is pregnant. Panicked, Chris asks her to get an abortion, but she refuses, saying that she wants to raise the child with him. Chris becomes distant from Chloe, who suspects he is having an affair, which he denies. Nola urges Chris to divorce his wife, and he feels trapped and finds himself lying to Chloe as well as to Nola. Nola confronts him on the street outside his apartment and he just barely escapes public detection.

Soon afterwards, Chris takes a shotgun from his father-in-law's home and carries it to his office in a tennis bag. After leaving the office, he calls Nola on her mobile to tell her he has good news for her. He goes to Nola's building and gains entry into the apartment of her neighbor, Mrs. Eastby, whom he shoots and kills and then stages a burglary by ransacking the rooms and stealing jewelry and drugs. As Nola returns, he shoots her in the stairwell. Chris then takes a taxi to the theater to watch a musical with Chloe. Scotland Yard investigates the crime and concludes it was likely committed by a drug addict stealing money. The following day, as the murder is in the news, Chris returns the shotgun and he and Chloe announce that she is pregnant.

Detective Mike Banner invites Chris for an interview in relation to the murder. Before he goes in to see the detectives, Chris throws Mrs. Eastby's jewelry and drugs into the river, but by chance her ring bounces on the railing and falls to the pavement. This imagery ties in to the opening scene when a tennis ball hits the net, but bounces back, and the narrator (Chris) says, "The man who said, 'I'd rather be lucky than good,' saw deeply into life. People are afraid to face how great a part of life is dependent on luck. It's scary to think so much is out of one's control. There are moments in a match when the ball hits the top of the net, and for a split second, it can either go forward or fall back. With a little luck, it goes forward, and you win. Or maybe it doesn't, and you lose."

At the police station, Chris lies about his relationship with Nola, but Banner surprises him with her diary, in which he is featured extensively. He confesses his affair but denies any link to the murder, and appeals to the detectives not to involve him further in their investigation as news of the affair may end his marriage just as he and his wife are expecting a baby.

One night, Chris sees apparitions of Nola and Mrs. Eastby, who tell him to be ready for the consequences of his actions. He replies that his crimes, though wrong, had been "necessary", and that he is able to suppress his guilt. The same night, Banner dreams that Chris committed the murders.

The next morning, however, his theory is discredited by his partner, Dowd, who informs him that a drug addict found murdered on the streets had Mrs. Eastby's ring in his pocket. Banner and Dowd consider the case closed and abandon any further investigation. Chloe gives birth to a baby boy named Terence, and his uncle blesses him not with greatness but with luck.

Cast
 Jonathan Rhys Meyers as Chris Wilton
 Scarlett Johansson as Nola Rice
 Emily Mortimer as Chloe Hewett Wilton
 Matthew Goode as Tom Hewett
 Brian Cox as Alec Hewett
 Penelope Wilton as Eleanor Hewett
 Ewen Bremner as Inspector Dowd
 James Nesbitt as Detective Mike Banner
 Rupert Penry-Jones as Henry
 Margaret Tyzack as Mrs. Betty Eastby
 Alexander Armstrong as Mr. Townsend
 Geoffrey Streatfeild as Alan Sinclair
 Miranda Raison as Heather
 Zoe Telford as Samantha
 Rose Keegan as Carol
 Colin Salmon as Ian
 Toby Kebbell as Policeman
 Paul Kaye as Estate Agent
 Steve Pemberton as Detective Parry

Production
The script was originally set in The Hamptons, a wealthy enclave in New York, but was transferred to London when Allen found financing for the film there. The film was partly funded by BBC Films, which required that he make the film in the UK with largely local cast and crew. In an interview with The Observer, Allen explained that he was allowed "the same kind of creative liberal attitude that I'm used to", in London. He complained that the American studio system was not interested in making small films: "They only want these $100 million pictures that make $500m." A further change was required when Kate Winslet, who was supposed to play the part of Nola Rice, resigned a week before filming was scheduled to begin. Scarlett Johansson was offered the part, and accepted, but the character had to be re-written as an American. According to Allen, "It was not a problem...It took about an hour."

Filming took place in London in the summer of 2004 over a seven-week schedule. Some of the city's landmarks, such as Tate Modern, Norman Foster's "Gherkin" building at 30 St Mary Axe, Richard Rogers' Lloyd's building, the Royal Opera House, the Palace of Westminster, Blackfriars Bridge, and Cambridge Circus form a backdrop to the film. The tennis club scenes were filmed at the Queen's Club. One of the University of Westminster's Marylebone campus lecture theatres was also used. UK-based graffiti artist Banksy's Girl With Balloon appears briefly in the film. One of the Parliament View apartments at Lambeth Bridge was used for interiors of Chris and Chloe's apartment. The restaurant scene was shot at the Covent Garden Hotel.

Themes

The film's opening voiceover from Wilton introduces its themes of chance and fate, which he characterizes as simple luck, to him all-important. The sequence establishes the protagonist as an introvert, a man who mediates his experience of the world through deliberation, and positions the film's subjective perspective through his narrative eyes. Charalampos Goyios argued that this hero, as an opera lover, maintains a sense of distance from the outer world and that ramifications therein pale in comparison to the purity of interior experience.

The film is a debate with Fyodor Dostoevsky's Crime and Punishment, which Wilton is seen reading early on, identifying him with the anti-hero Raskolnikov. That character is a brooding loner who kills two women to prove that he is a superior being, but is racked by guilt and is finally redeemed by confession of his crime, the love of a young woman forced into prostitution, and the discovery of God. Wilton is a brooding loner who kills a poor girl who loves him because he considers his interests superior to those around him, knows little guilt, and avoids detection through luck. Allen signals his intentions with more superficial similarities: both are almost caught by a painter's unexpected appearance in the stairwell, and both sleuths play cat and mouse with the suspect. Allen argues, unlike Dostoevsky, that there is neither God, nor punishment, nor love to provide redemption. The theme of parody and reversal of Dostoevsky's motifs and subject matter has been visited by Allen before, in his film Love and Death. In Love and Death, the dialogue and scenarios parody Russian novels, particularly those by Dostoevsky and Tolstoy, such as The Brothers Karamazov, Crime and Punishment, The Gambler, The Idiot, and War and Peace. In Match Point, Allen moves the theme from parody to the more direct engagement of Dostoevsky's motifs and narratives.

Allen revisits some of the themes he had explored in Crimes and Misdemeanors (1989), such as the existence of justice in the universe. Both films feature a murder of an unwanted mistress, and "offer a depressing view on fate, fidelity, and the nature of man". That film's protagonist, Judah Rosenthal, is an affluent member of the upper-middle class having an extramarital affair. After he tries to break the affair off, his mistress blackmails him and threatens to go to his wife. Soon, Rosenthal decides to murder his mistress, but is racked with guilt over violating his moral code. Eventually, he learns to ignore his guilt and go on as though nothing has happened. Philip French compared the two films' plots and themes in The Observer, and characterized Match Point'''s as a "clever twist on the themes of chance and fate".

Money is an important motivator for the characters: both Wilton and Nola come from modest backgrounds and wish to enter the Hewett family using their sex appeal. That family's secure position is demonstrated by their large country estate, and, early on in their relationships, both prospective spouses are supported by Mr. Hewett, Wilton with a position on "one of his companies" and Nola reports being "swept off her feet" by Hewett's attention and presents. Roger Ebert posed the film's underlying question as "To what degree are we prepared to set aside our moral qualms in order to indulge in greed and selfishness? Wilton is facing a choice between greed and lust, but his sweet wife, Chloe, herself has no qualms about having her father essentially 'buy' her husband for her."

Jean-Baptiste Morain, writing in Les Inrockuptibles, noticed how the strong do not accept their own weakness and have no qualms about perpetuating an injustice to defend their interests. This wider political sense is, he argued, accentuated by its English setting, where class differences are more marked than in the USA. The film pits passion and the dream of happiness against ambition and arrivisme, resolving the dispute with a pitiless blow that disallows all chance of justice.

Musical accompaniment
The film's soundtrack consists almost entirely of pre-World War I 78 rpm recordings of opera arias sung by the Italian tenor Enrico Caruso. This bold use, despite Caruso's variety of musical styles, constitutes a first for Allen. Opera has been used before in his work as an indicator of social class, such as in Husbands and Wives (1992). In Match Point, the arias and opera extracts make an ironic commentary on the actions of the characters and sometimes foreshadow developments in the movie's narrative. Furthermore, given Wilton's status as an introvert and opera enthusiast himself, the accompaniment emphasizes his detachment from his crime.

The 10-minute murder scene which forms the film's climax is scored with almost the whole of the Act II duet between Otello and Iago from Giuseppe Verdi's Otello. This is an atypical scoring for a film, since Verdi's piece is not an aria, but a dramatic dialogue in which the words are as important as the music. Thus the astute spectator will be presented with two dramatic narratives to follow; Allen is not respecting traditional conventions of cinematic accompaniment, since the score's events do not match the story unfolding onscreen.

Arias and extracts include work by Verdi (in particular Macbeth, La traviata,  Il trovatore and Rigoletto), Gaetano Donizetti's L'elisir d'amore, Georges Bizet's Les pêcheurs de perles, and Antônio Carlos Gomes's Salvator Rosa sung by Caruso. The romanza "Una furtiva lagrima" from L'elisir d'amore is featured repeatedly, including during the opening credits. The Caruso arias are supplemented by diegetic music from contemporary performances that the characters attend over the course of the film. There are scenes at the Royal Opera House and elsewhere performed by opera singers (scenes from La traviata performed by Janis Kelly and Alan Oke, from Rigoletto performed by Mary Hegarty), accompanied by a piano (performed by Tim Lole).

Reception
Allen has said that Match Point is one of his few "A-films", and even "arguably may be the best film that I've made. This is strictly accidental, it just happened to come out right. You know, I try to make them all good, but some come out and some don't. With this one everything seemed to come out right. The actors fell in, the photography fell in and the story clicked. I caught a lot of breaks!"

The film was screened out of competition at the 2005 Cannes Film Festival. Match Point broke a streak of box office flops for Allen: it earned $85,306,374 worldwide, of which $23,151,529 was in its North American run. Allen was also nominated for an Academy Award for Best Original Screenplay.

The film received generally strong reviews from critics, particularly in the United States. On Rotten Tomatoes, the film has an approval rating of 77% based on 216 reviews with an average rating of 7.2/10. The website's critical consensus states: "Woody Allen's sharpest film in years, Match Point is a taut, philosophical thriller about class and infidelity." Metacritic reported the film had an average score of 72 out of 100, and thus "generally favorable reviews", based on 40 professional critics. Roger Ebert gave the film a full four stars, and considered it among the four best Allen films. He described it as having a "terrible fascination that lasts all the way through". Empire magazine gave the film four stars out of five, calling it Allen's best of his last half a dozen films, and recommended it even to those who are not fans of the director.

Reviewers in the United Kingdom were generally less favorable. Philip French, writing in The Observer, criticized Allen's grasp of British idiom and the film's lack of humor, especially considering that two comic actors from the UK were cast in minor roles. Also, he called the dialogue "rather lumbering" and said that "the lexicons of neither the City financier nor the London constable are used convincingly." Tim Robey, writing in The Daily Telegraph, disdained the claim that the film was Allen's return to form. Although he acknowledged that the consensus was stronger this time, he called it "as flat-footed a movie as Allen has ever made, a decent idea scuppered by a setting – London – which he treats with the peculiarly tin-eared reverence of a visitor who only thinks he knows his way around." He called Johansson's character "the chain-smoking mistress from hell", but said the tennis net analogy has an "unexpectedly crisp payoff" and that the last act was well handled. Reviewing for the BBC's website, Andy Jacobs awarded the film four stars out of five, and called it Allen's best film since Deconstructing Harry (1997). He also criticized some other British reviewers whose dislike, Jacobs stated, was due to the fact that Allen presented an agreeable portrait of middle class life in London. He also praised the performances by Rhys Meyers and Johansson.

Like many of Allen's films, Match Point was popular in France: AlloCiné, a cinema information website, gave it a score of 4.4 out of 5, based on a sample of 30 reviews. In Les Inrockuptibles, a left-wing French cultural magazine, Jean-Baptiste Morain gave the film a strong review, calling it "one of his most accomplished films". He characterized Allen's move to London as re-invigorating for him, while recognizing the caricatured portrayal of Britain which made the film less appreciated there than in Allen's homeland, the United States. Morain called Rhys-Meyers' and Johansson's performances "impeccable".Match Point has also been the object of scholarship. Joseph Henry Vogel argued the film is exemplary of ecocriticism as an economic school of thought. Several critics and commentators have compared elements of the film to the central plot of George Stevens' film A Place in the Sun'' (1951), but with some characters in reverse positions.

Accolades

References

External links

  (BBC Films)
 
 
 
 
 

2005 films
2005 psychological thriller films
2005 romantic drama films
2005 thriller drama films
2000s American films
2000s British films
2000s English-language films
2000s pregnancy films
2000s psychological drama films
2000s romantic thriller films
American pregnancy films
American psychological drama films
American psychological thriller films
American romantic drama films
American romantic thriller films
American thriller drama films
BBC Film films
British pregnancy films
British psychological drama films
British psychological thriller films
British romantic drama films
British romantic thriller films
British thriller drama films
DreamWorks Pictures films
English-language Luxembourgian films
Films about adultery in the United Kingdom
Films about murder
Films about the upper class
Films based on Crime and Punishment
Films directed by Woody Allen
Films produced by Gareth Wiley
Films produced by Letty Aronson
Films set in London
Films shot in Berkshire
Films shot in London
Films with screenplays by Woody Allen
HanWay Films films
Luxembourgian romantic drama films
Luxembourgian thriller films
Tennis films